Fulsome Creek is a stream in the U.S. state of Georgia.  It is a tributary to the Ogeechee River.

The creek derives its name from Captain Benjamin Fulsam, an early settler who was killed by Indians. Variant spellings are "Folsoms Creek", "Fulsams Creek", and "Fulsoms Creek".

References

Rivers of Georgia (U.S. state)
Rivers of Hancock County, Georgia